Leo Peter Lamoureux (October 1, 1916 – January 11, 1961) was a Canadian ice hockey defenceman. Lamoureux played his entire National Hockey League career with the Montreal Canadiens. He was born in Espanola, Ontario, but grew up in Kirkland Lake, Ontario.

Lamoureux was named a QSHL First team All-Star in 1940. Montreal called him up for the 1941–42 season. He would retire after the 1947 season. He won two Stanley Cups with Montreal in 1944 and 1946. After leaving the NHL, Lamoureux became a player/coach with the Indianapolis Chiefs. During the 1960-61 season,
Lamoureux became ill and entered an Indianapolis hospital where he was diagnosed with acute hepatitis, from which
he died January 11, 1961.

See also
Leo P. Lamoureux Memorial Trophy

References

External links

Picture of Leo Lamoureux's Name on the 1944 Stanley Cup Plaque
Picture of Leo Lamoureux's Name on the 1946 Stanley Cup Plaque

1916 births
1961 deaths
Canadian expatriates in the United Kingdom
Canadian expatriates in the United States
Canadian ice hockey defencemen
Detroit Hettche players
Earls Court Rangers players
Franco-Ontarian people
Ice hockey people from Ontario
Indianapolis Chiefs players
Montreal Canadiens players
People from Kirkland Lake
Stanley Cup champions
Washington Lions players